The Regional Council of Picardy was the deliberative assembly of the former French region of Picardy, a decentralized territorial community. Its headquarters were in Amiens and it was headed last by Claude Gewerc (PS) between March 28, 2004, and December 31, 2015.

Executive 
The vice-presidents of the council from 2010 to 2015 were:

List of presidents of the Regional Council

References 

Picardy
Picardy
Picardy